This article contains a list of United States Coast Guard stations in the United States within the United States Coast Guard's nine districts. There are currently many stations located throughout the country along the shores of the Atlantic Ocean, Gulf of Mexico, Pacific Ocean and Great Lakes. Although many of the stations have been located on shore, floating stations have been based on the Ohio River and Dorchester Bay.

Many of the stations listed date from the 1800s, during the existence of the United States Life-Saving Service. Development of stations were started with the 1848 signing of the Newell Act. This act allowed Congress to appropriate $10,000 to established unmanned life-saving stations along the New Jersey coast south of New York Harbor and to provide "surf boat, rockets, carronades and other necessary apparatus for the better preservation of life and property from shipwreck ... ." During that same year, the Massachusetts Humane Society received funds from Congress for life-saving stations on the Massachusetts coastline. Over the next six years, further stations were built, although they were loosely managed.

The advent of air stations beginning in 1920 meant that some stations would become obsolete, as air coverage and improved technology were better able to supplement the rescue of mariners in remote regions. With early air stations using aircraft that could land on water, boat and air stations could work together to make sure that maximum help could be provided in time of need.

First District

Maine

New Hampshire

Vermont

Massachusetts

Rhode Island

Connecticut

New York

New Jersey

Fourth, Fifth, and Sixth District

New Jersey

Pennsylvania

Delaware

Maryland

Washington, D.C.

Virginia

North Carolina

Seventh District

South Carolina

Georgia

Florida

Puerto Rico

Eighth District

Florida

Alabama

Mississippi

Louisiana

Texas

Kentucky

Ninth District

New York

Pennsylvania

Ohio

Michigan

Indiana

Illinois

Wisconsin

Minnesota

Eleventh District

California

Thirteenth District

Oregon

Washington

Fourteenth District

Hawaii

Guam

Seventeenth District

Alaska

See also

List of United States military bases
United States Coast Guard Air Stations

References

External links

Life-Saving Service & Coast Guard Stations: Historic Small Boat & Other Shore Stations

 
Stations

Coast G
.